The Mineral County Museum is located at 400 Tenth Street, Hawthorne, Nevada.  It has over 15,000 square feet of display space.  The collection includes antique clothing, mining equipment, minerals, photographs, horse-drawn carriages, and fire equipment.

Notes

External links
Mineral County Museum

History museums in Nevada
Hawthorne, Nevada
Museums in Mineral County, Nevada